Ecobriga or Ecobrogis was a town of ancient Galatia, inhabited during Roman and Byzantine times. 

Its site is located near Sorsovus, Asiatic Turkey.

References

Populated places in ancient Galatia
Former populated places in Turkey
Roman towns and cities in Turkey
History of Kırıkkale Province